Tvrdomestice is a municipality in the Topoľčany District of the Nitra Region, Slovakia. In 2016 it had 450 inhabitants.

References

External links 
Tvrdomestice – Okres Topoľčany – E-OBCE.sk
Obec Tvrdomestice

Villages and municipalities in Topoľčany District